Teardrops is the debut studio album by Belgian singer-songwriter, Tom Dice. It was released on 30 April 2010. The album reached number 1 in Belgium. The album was produced by Tom Dice, Erhan Kurkun and Jeroen Swinnen.

Singles
"Bleeding Love" was the first single to be released from the album, the single peaked to number 7 in Belgium. "Me And My Guitar" was the second single released from the album. Tom Dice sang the song at the Eurovision Song Contest 2010 for Belgium in the final Tom scored 143 points and finished 6th, it also reached number 1 in Belgium. "Lucy" is the third single released from the album and has so far peaked at number 21 in Belgium. "A Thousand Years" is the fourth single released from the album and has so far peaked at number 44 in Belgium.

Track listing

Charts and certifications

Weekly charts

Year-end charts

Certifications

References

2010 albums
Tom Dice albums